The 2006 FIFA Club World Cup final took place at the International Stadium Yokohama, Japan on 17 December 2006.

The match pitted Internacional of Brazil, the CONMEBOL club champions, against Barcelona of Spain, the UEFA club champions. Internacional won 1–0, after a counter-attack led by Iarley and the goal scored by Adriano Gabiru at the 82nd minute, in a match watched by 67,128 people. In doing so, Internacional won their first FIFA Club World Cup/Intercontinental Cup and Barcelona remained without any world club title. Deco was named as man of the match.

Road to final

Match details

Details

Statistics

References

External links
FIFA Club World Cup Japan 2006, FIFA.com
Technical Report and Statistics (PDF), FIFA.com

World
Final
Sport Club Internacional matches
FC Barcelona matches
2006
World
Sports competitions in Yokohama
2000s in Yokohama